Gregory (559–630) was the bishop of Agrigento from 590 until at least 603 and a correspondent of Pope Gregory I. He is the probable subject of two semi-legendary saint's lives and possible author of a commentary on Ecclesiastes, although both of these identifications have been questioned.

Biography
According to his biography, Gregory was born near Agrigento on Sicily in 559. His mother's name was Theodote. At the age of eighteen, he went on a pilgrimage in the Holy Land, traveling via Carthage to Tripoli. He was almost sold into slavery by a naukleros (ship-owner) in Carthage. The account of his travels in his biography has a romantic character and seems to have been an influence on the 10th-century Life of Gregentios.

While in Jerusalem, he was ordained a deacon by Patriarch Makarios II (c. 563 – c. 575). He returned to Agrigento via Constantinople and Rome. In 590, two factions with their respective candidates for the vacant see of Agrigento traveled to Rome to seek  the pope's decision. Pope Gregory bypassed both candidates and consecrated Gregory of Agrigento. He was found hiding in a monastic garden out of reticence for high office when Gregory chose him.

The biography attributes to Gregory an education in classics, rhetoric and theology. He is said to have read the Life of Basil of Caesarea many times and the Passion of the Holy Maccabees. At the request of a bishop, he interpreted the writings of Gregory of Nazianzus for a group of deacons. The biographer praises him as a second Chrysostom. By a miracle, he was able to fast constantly. He is also credited with performing healing miracles.

By 591, Gregory had been falsely accused of wrongdoing and was imprisoned. According to the biography, the accusers were a certain Sabinus and Crescentius. A papal letter of August 591 ordered him to appear along with the bishops of Catania and Palermo before the sub-deacon Peter, a papal agent. In November 592, the pope wrote to Bishop Maximian of Syracuse demanding that he send Gregory's accusers and some documentation to Rome without delay. In this letter, the pope refers to a letter he addressed to Gregory that has not survived. Some sources have him as deposed from his see by 594, but the pope in a letter names Gregory as still bishop in January 603. According to some sources, he died in 630.

Hagiography

A life of Gregory was written by Leontios of the monastery of San Saba in Rome. Its full title is An Account of the Life of Saint Gregory, Bishop of the Church of Agrigento. It is a lengthy work in Greek. It was translated into Latin in the 18th century by Stefano Antonio Morcelli. Its two most recent editors disagree regarding the date of its composition and its relative historicity. Albrecht Berger assigns it to the period between 750 and 828 on the grounds that it relies on the Donation of Constantine (unknown before the mid-8th century). He rejects an early date on the grounds that there is no evidence for Greek-speaking monasteries in Rome before 649. John Martyn, arguing from correspondences between the biography and the papal letters, assigns it an early date of around 640. Leontios is by some said to have died in 688, providing a terminus ante quem if he is the author.

The editors' assessments of Gregory's biography's historical value also differ. For Berger, "though it has a historical core, [it] is in large parts legendary." He does not think that the historical person at the core was the bishop. For Martyn, it is "an important, contemporary document on the cities, clergy and people of Agrigento, Jerusalem, Antioch, Constantinople and Rome during" the papacy of Gregory I and one of very few 7th-century sources on Sicily. There are contradictions in the biography and in the account in the Synaxarion of Constantinople. The latter has him alive during the patriarchate of Makarios II and the reign of the Emperor Justinian II (685–711) over a century later. The biography depicts him as a contemporary of the monothelite controversy, which began in 629. When he is arrested in Agrigento, the Emperor Justinian intervenes with the pope to secure his release. The biography depicts the Sicilian episcopate as supporting Gregory against the papacy and in general has an anti-papal tone. Morcelli, in his Latin edition, argued that the anti-papal tone stemmed from some pamphlets directed against Gregory I that circulated in Rome after his death. To Morcelli, it was evidence of the early date of the biography.

The biography of Gregory survives in twenty manuscripts. Besides the original work of Leontios (BHG 707), there is also a biography (BHG 708) by Niketas David Paphlagon (fl. c. 900). This was the text used by the compiler Simeon Metaphrastes in the 10th century. It was one of only 14 texts out of 148 that Simeon left intact and did not rework, and one of only seven that he promised the reader would give them pleasure to read. There are also two shorter reworkings of Leontios' biography, one (BHG 707p) attributed to Mark, hegoumenos of San Saba, and another (BHG 708f) anonymous.

Gregory's feast is celebrated on 23 or 24 November in the Eastern Orthodox Church. It is on 24 November in the work of Simeon Metaphrastes. It was introduced to the Roman Martyrology by Cardinal Caesar Baronius on 23 November. The popularity of Gregory's cult can be gauged by the large number of surviving iconographic representations of him.

Commentary on Ecclesiastes

The hagiography supplies a list of works by Gregory, one of which was dedicated to Saint Andrew, described as "chief" (koryphaios) of the apostles. A Greek commentary on Ecclesiastes is traditionally attributed to the bishop of Agrigento. This attribution is rejected by some, who think the exegete must have been writing in the time of Justinian II. Since the earliest manuscripts of the commentary date from the 8th or 9th centuries, the commentator can only securely be placed in the 7th century. The result of this theory is the existence of two distinct Gregories of Agrigentum, the bishop (fl. c. 600) and the exegete (fl. c. 700).

The commentary attributed to Gregory is considered one of the best on Ecclesiastes from antiquity.

Notes

References

Sources

Further reading

People from Agrigento
559 births
630 deaths
6th-century Italian bishops
7th-century Italian bishops
7th-century Christian saints
Medieval Italian saints
Religious leaders from the Province of Agrigento
Sicilian saints